Mithlesh Kumar is an Indian politician and a former member of the 15th Lok Sabha of India. He represented the Shahjahanpur constituency of Uttar Pradesh and is a member of the Samajwadi Party (SP) political party. Shahjahanpur constituency was reserved seat for Scheduled caste category.

Personal life
Kumar holds B.Sc. degree from Bareilly College in Uttar Pradesh. He was a social worker before joining politics. He married Sakuntla Devi in 1987. They have two sons and a daughter.

Posts Held

See also

List of members of the 15th Lok Sabha of India

References 

India MPs 2009–2014
Living people
1964 births
Samajwadi Party politicians
People from Shahjahanpur district
Lok Sabha members from Uttar Pradesh
Uttar Pradesh MLAs 2002–2007
Uttar Pradesh MLAs 2007–2012